Chapainawabganj (Bengali: চাঁপাইনবাবগঞ্জ) is located in the north-western part of Bangladesh. It is a part of the Rajshahi Division, and was formerly a sub-division of Malda district. The north and west part of Chapai Nawabganj is bounded by Malda and Murshidabad districts of India, the east by Naogaon District, and south-east by Rajshahi District.

History

Chapainawabganj was one of the sub-divisions of the former Rajshahi zilla. Chapai Nawabganj was part of ancient Gour capital. It is said that this area had strategic and commercial importance due to its location at the junction of the rivers Mahananda and the Ganges. Because of its importance, Alivardi Khan founded Nowabganj town which in course of time known as Nawabganj. Until 1947, Nawabganj was a thana under Malda district, India.

The gateway of North Bengal, Malda was once the capital of Gour-Banga, with 3456 km2 of land classified as Tal, Diara, and Barind. Malda awaits the advent of tourists and people of archaeological interest with its wealth to be enjoyed and its huge potential to be explored.

This portion of the earth is washed by the waves of the rivers Ganges, Mahananda, Fulahar, and Kalindri. It has witnessed different empires which were raised, flourished, and then cast down near oblivion by a successor kingdom built up on the relics of its predecessor. Panini mentioned a city named Gourpura, which by strong reason may be identified as the city of Gouda, ruins of which are situated in this district. Examples are legion of the relic of a predecessor kingdom being used in the monuments of the successor kingdoms. It had been within the limits of ancient 'Gaur' and 'Pandua' (Pundrabardhana).

These two cities had been the capital of Bengal in ancient and medieval ages. The boundary of Gour was changed in different ages since 5th century BC. Its name can be found in Puranic texts. Pundranagar was the provincial capital of Maurya Empire. Gour and Pundrabardhana formed parts of the Mourya empire as is evinced from the inscriptions, Brahmilipi on a seal discovered from the ruins of Mahasthangarh in the Bogra District of Bangladesh. Hiuen Tsang saw many Ashokan stupas at Pundrabardhana. The inscriptions discovered in the district of undivided Dinajpur and other parts of North Bengal along with the Allahabad Pillar inscriptions of Samudragupta clearly indicate that the whole of North Bengal as far east as Kamrup formed a part of the Gupta empire.

After the Guptas in the early 7th century AD, king Sasanka of Karnasubarna as well as the king of Gaur ruled independently for more than three decades. From the middle of 8th century to the end of 11th century, the Pala Empire ruled Bengal and the kings were devoted to Buddhism. It was during their reign that the Jagadalla Vihara (monastery) in Barindri flourished paralleling with Nalanda, Vikramshila, and Devikot. The Pala Dynasty yielded to the emergence of Sena Empire. The Sen rulers were Hindus and in the habit of moving from place to place within their kingdom. At the time of Lakshman Sen Gour was known as Lakshmanabati. The Sen kings ruled Bengal till Bakhtiyar Khilji conquered Bengal in 1204 AD. Thereafter the Muslim rule lasted for about five hundred years. Sirajuddaulah was defeated by Lord Clive at the battle of Plassey in 1757, which marked the beginning of British rule. From ancient times, rulers of various origins, religions, and dynasties left imprints of their times on the earth in this district. Those who left ruins and relics speak of past pomp and grandeur, and hold interest for archaeologists and tourists.

This district, Malda, formed in 1813 out of the outlying areas of Purnia, Dinajpur, and Rajshahi districts. At the time of Dr. B. Hamilton (1808–09), the presents thanas of Gazole, Malda, Bamongola, and part of Habibpur were included in the district of Dinajpur and the thanas of Harischandrapur, Kharba, Ratua, Manikchak, and Kaliachak were included in the district of Purnia. In 1813, in consequence of the prevalence of serious crimes in the Kaliachak and Sahebganj thanas and also on the rivers, a joint magistrate and deputy collector were appointed at English Bazar with jurisdiction over a number of police stations centred around that place and taken from the two district. Thus the district of Malda was born.

The year 1832, saw the establishment of a separate treasury, and in 1859 a full-fledged magistrate and collector was posted. Up to 1876 this district formed part of Rajshahi Division, and from 1876 to 1905 it formed part of Bhagalpur Division. In 1905, it was again transferred to Rajshahi Division, and until 1947 Malda remained in this division. In August 1947 this district was affected by the Partition of India. Between 12 and 15 August 1947 whether the district would become part of India or Pakistan was unknown, as the announcement of the Radcliffe Line did not make this point clear. During these few days the district was under a magistrate of East Pakistan until the details of the Radcliffe award were published and the district became part of West Bengal on 17 August 1947. Five thanas were given to Pakistan under the district of Rajshahi which later formed as Chapai Nawabganj.

Geography

Geographical location
Chapainawabganj is the most western district of Bangladesh. Rajshahi and Naogaon is on the east, while on the Indian side is Malda of West Bengal, the rest of India is on the north. Western side is surrounded by the river Padma and Malda district and Murshidabad of West Bengal (India), India is on the southern side. Chapai Nawabganj is situated between the latitude 24'22 to 24'57 and longitude 87'23 to 88'23.

Topography
Chapainawabganj District (Rajshahi division) has an area of 1702.55 km2. Many rivers flows over this area. The main rivers are the Ganges, and Mahananda. Most of the land of this area are plain land with many small ponds and water reservoirs. But, recently, the geography has changed due to the erosion by the river Padma (Ganges). Overload of river sediment caused by farrakka barrage eroded the river banks and created a large area of land full of sand which almost looks like a small desert in this area. Four to five small union parisad like narayonpur, johurpur, sundorpur, baghdanga has shifted to the other side of the river Padma.

Based on formation of soil, Chapai Nawabganj can be divided into two different parts 1. Borendra area and 2. Diyar area.

Borendra area
The east part of the river Mohananda is part of Borind Track and known as borendra area. Borendra area is one of the oldest well known areas not only in Bangladesh but also all over the sub-continent. Borendra area was formed during the formation of the triangle of Bengal. Chapai Nawabganj sadar, part of Gomostapur Upozilla and Nachol constitutes the borendra area. The main crops of this area is the rice.

Diyar area
The region in the river Padma basin is known as diyar. The area formed for the continuous change of path of the river Padma. The soil of this area are very fertile and people can cultivate multiple times a year of different type of crops. Main crops are rice, wheat, melons– the most famous corn is Kalai. Mango gardens are increasing rapidly beside these crops now. This area was also famous for the cultivation of neel(indigo) and reshom(silk).

Rivers and waters

Padma River
The Ganges river originates in the Himalayas and flows through Northern and Eastern India. This river then enters into Bangladesh at Shibganj and takes the name Padma. The Farakka Barrage was built 10 miles upstream of where Padma enters into Bangladesh which decreased the water level of Padma. But still in rainy season, this river becomes very dangerous as the water level grows high and floods the area nearby.

Mahananda River
Mahananda River entered to this district through Bholahat Upozilla and flows through the district and finally falls to the river Padma at Godagari, Rajshahi district. Nawabganj town is situated on the bank of this river and the economy of this district is driven by this river too.

Pagla
The Pagla River also flows from India and enters into Bangladesh in this district at Tattipur, Moraganga (dead gangis). After flowing a mile, it mixes with the river Mahananda.

Punarbhaba River
The Punarbhaba River flows through Dinajpur and Naogoan of Bangladesh and then enters into Chapainawabganj.

Climate
Chapainabganj is very close to the big city Rajshahi and the climate of both districts are very close. Under Köppen climate classification, Rajshahi has a tropical wet and dry climate. The climate of Rajshahi is generally marked with monsoons, high temperature, considerable humidity and moderate rainfall. The hot season commences early in March and continues till the middle of July. The highest rainfall is observed during the months of monsoon.

Demographics

According to the 2011 Bangladesh census, Chapai Nawbganj District had a population of 1,647,521, of which 810,218 were males and 837,303 females. Rural population was 1,327,243 (80.56%) while the urban population was 320,278 (19.44%). Chapai Nawabganj district had a literacy rate of 42.94% for the population 7 years and above: 41.55% for males and 44.27% for females.

Religion

According to 2011 Bangladesh census, Muslims formed 95.36% of the population and Hindus 4.04%. Ethnic population was 14,190.

Post-compulsory education

Chapainawabganj has only one university at its boro Indara Moor. Exim Bank Agricultural University Bangladesh (EBAUB) was established in 2013 to provide students of this area with education specializing in agriculture. It also provides undergraduate degrees in Agricultural Economics, Business Administration and Law. Along with Nawabganj Govt. College and Shah Neyamotullah College, EXIM Bank Agricultural University is considered to be the pinnacle of educational institutions in this district.

Notable colleges in Chapainawabganj District:
 Adina Fazlul Haque Govt. College
 Nawabganj Govt.College
 Chapainawabganj Polytechnic Institute
 Rahanpur Homoeopathic Medical College 
 Nawabganj City College
 Shibganj Mohila Degree College
 Ranihati Degree College
 Sara Bangla A K Fojlol Haqe College
 Shibgang Boys College
 Namoshankarbati Degree College

The students and teachers originally from Chapainawabganj formed a committee named 'Chapainawabganj Somiti' in many institutions outside of Chapainawabganj.

Economy

This district is mainly a plain land with rivers. The whole district is full of fertile land with proper irrigation facilities. That is why the economy is totally dependent on agriculture. But as there are a number of rivers flowing through this district, and many people depend on fishing and other related activities.

Chapainawabganj is called the capital of the mango in Bangladesh because it is this summer fruit that is the main product that sustains the economy of this district. Most of the land of this district is full of mango orchards where various kinds of mango are produced. The economy is surrounded by the production of the mango in this district. The main part of mango production is the Shibganj, Bholahat and Gamostapur upazila.

Culture

Gombhira gaan is a kind of folk song popular in this district.

Now-a-days, Gambhira reflects contemporary social problems through witty dialogue, songs, dances and jokes. This is the main part in any cultural celebration in this district with great entertainment and explanation of social problems.

The people of Chapainawabganj use the Bangla language but they have their own dialect. The dialect consists of different tone as well as different words than to standard Bangla language.

Religion
The district of Chapainawabganj consists of 1987 mosques, 474 temples, 56 Buddhist temples and 28 churches. Chotto Sona Mosque, Chapai Mosque, 15th century Darashbari Mosque, etc. are famous mosques. Jora Math is the famous Buddhist monastery and Naoda Stupa is the Buddhist monument.

Places of interest

Choto Sona Mosque

One of the most graceful monument of the Sultanate period is the Chhota Sona Masjid or Sona Mosque at Gaur in Chapainawabganj Built by one Wali Muhammad during the reign of Sultan Alauddin Husain Shah (1493–1519). Originally it was roofed over with 15 gold-gilded domes including the 3 Chauchala domes in the middle row, from which it derives its curious name. By the side of this mosque great martyr Birsrestha Captain Mohiuddin Jahangir laid in peace.

Administration
Chapainawabganj district comprises five Upazilas:
 Bholahat Upazila
 Gomastapur Upazila
 Nachole Upazila
 Chapainawabganj Sadar Upazila and
 Shibganj Upazila.

There are four municipalities
 Chapainawabganj Municipality
 ShibganjMunicipality
 RohanpurMunicipality
 NacholeMunicipality

Transport

This district is the most western district in Bangladesh which has boundary with the neighboring country India. And for importing and exporting, there is a land port in this district which makes this district an important route for communicating with the neighboring country. And the construction of the Jamuna Bridge at Sirajganj also makes its transportation system an important one all over the country. That is why highways were constructed over the district. The major transport systems inside the town is the bike, rickshaws, bi-cycle and CNG rickshaws.

Bus
The major transportation system in this town is the bus service to different districts and towns. The main transportation route is Nawabganj-Rajshahi. The bus transportation service is off three types which are gate-lock, direct and local service. The others bus routes are Nawabganj-Shibganj, Nawabganj-Naogaon, Nawabganj-Nachol, Nawabganj-Rohanpur. The BRTC bus service serves for the long intra-district route to almost all important districts of Bangladesh. The most important long route is the Nawabganj-Dhaka. This route has ample bus service. There are two bus stoppages. The biggest one is called Chapai Nawabganj Bus Terminal and the other is the Dhaka Bus Terminal. Sona Mosjid-Rajshahi-Sona Mosjid bus Service are on at7.15am to 5.15 pm every 1 hour after.

Railway
Chapainawabganj has good inter-city railway service. Banalata Express is one of the non-stop rail service of the country which starts from Chapainawabganj and end at capital city Dhaka. One of the international rail line passes through this district to Malda, West Bengal, India. There are few services of local train from different stations of Chapainawabganj such as Nawabganj Sadar, Amnura, Nachole, Nijampur, Rahanpur to Rajshahi and other parts of Bangladesh and also has a shuttle service from Nawabganj to Rajshahi for the intercity train service from Rajshahi to other part of Bangladesh.

Waterway
In the past, the main transport system was based on the water path. The river Padma (Ganges), Mahananda River, Pagla, Punorvoba, Moraganga and some beels (marshland) were used for intra-district transport system. The water level went down due to adverse effect of Farakka Barrage on Padma (Ganges) river, and therefore, water transport has lost its popularity. But still rivers are used for transportation of daily goods from different parts of the district. Still the transportation from the villages in western and eastern parts of the district depends on the boat. In the Shibgonj Upozila have a small river named Pagla.

Media

Radio
 Radio Mahananda 98.8 FM, a community radio station was established with the financial help of Japan. The operation of Radio Mahananda was inaugurated by Bangladesh ex-minister Suranjit Sen Gupta.

Notable persons
 Khabeeruddin Ahmed
 Ila Mitra
 Emajuddin Ahmed
 Rafiqun Nabi
 Momtazuddin Ahmed
 Mohammad Moniruzzaman Miah
 Abdul Haque
 Mohammad Yusuf Siddiq, historian, epigraphist, researcher, professor and author

Notes

References

 

 
Districts of Bangladesh
Populated places in Rajshahi Division